Sunny Nwachukwu (born 15 January 1976 in Nigeria) is a Nigerian retired professional footballer who is last known to have trained with HSV Hoek in the Netherlands in 2003.

Career

Belgium

Earning minimum wage without inking a contract with Genk, Ekeren, and Tielen, Nwachukwu turned out for KSK Beveren in the preseason of 1998–99, bagging a brace in a friendly with Nieuwkerken-Waas which ended 3–1, before going on to appear in 6 league and cup games for Beveren and departing in 1999.

Canada

Starting for the first time with Montreal Impact when they hosted the Vancouver 86ers in 2000, the Nigerian was regarded as a palpable threat in the league for the Impact and had his contract extended in 2001 despite suffering an injury the previous season.

England

Impressed at Dagenham & Redbridge with two friendly goals in 2002.

References 

Living people
1976 births
Montreal Impact (1992–2011) players
K.S.K. Beveren players
Expatriate footballers in Belgium
Beerschot A.C. players
Expatriate soccer players in Canada
K.R.C. Genk players
Nigerian expatriate footballers
Nigerian footballers
Association football forwards
People from Maiduguri